Simchah Roth (died 2012) was an Israeli rabbi and scholar who edited the first prayer book of the Masorti movement. He advocated for veganism.

Career 

Roth moved to Israel in 1969, serving as the rabbi and resident lecturer of the WUJS Institute in Arad and then teaching in the development town of Yeroham. In 1989, Roth moved to Herzliyya, where he served as the rabbi of Torat Hayyim Masorti Congregation from 1989 until his retirement from that position in July 2007.

Roth served as a member of the Herzliyya Mo'etzah Datit, the Municipal Religious Council. He also held several posts in the Rabbinical Assembly in Israel: he served on the Va'ad Halakhah (Law Committee) of the Rabbinical Assembly in Israel; he was vice-president and a past member of the Executive Committee of the Rabbinical Assembly in Israel; and he has been the chairperson of the Religious Services Bureau of the Masorti Movement.

Roth was the editor of the first Masorti prayer book, Siddur Va'ani Tefillati. Roth has been noted for his attempts to try to reconcile four characteristics in this prayer book: that it be Masorti (Conservative), Israeli-Zionist, pluralistic, and innovative. According to the analysis of David Ellenson, Roth's prayer book claims that "the demands of the past are not absolute, nor is Jewish liturgical tradition frozen. The claims and sensibilities of the present are vital as well."

Notable Rulings 
Over the course of his career, Roth issued a number of notable rabbinic rulings.

In 2003, he ruled that homosexuality was not forbidden by biblical law and that rabbinical schools should be open to gay and lesbian Jews.

In 2005, he ruled that, at Passover time, chametz should be donated to needy non-Jews.

In 2007, he ruled that kissing mezuzahs should be avoided, in order to avoid the risk of contracting an infectious disease.

In 2009, Roth ruled that a Torah scroll written by a woman is permissible for use in a communal synagogue. Roth argued that since contemporary rabbis today obligate women in the learning of Torah, they should certainly be eligible to write a scroll.

Veganism

In 2010, Roth argued that Jews should adopt a vegan diet, based on four arguments:

 Modern mass-slaughter of animals constitutes cruelty to animals (tza'ar ba'alei hayyim) which is forbidden by the Torah
 Consumption of animal products as we moderns do contravenes the command of the Torah to maintain ourselves in good health
 Religious Jews should stop eating animal products (meat, eggs, milk etc.) in order to lessen greatly the damage we are doing to the planet
 If religious Jews adopt a vegan diet, they will be greatly contributing to promoting righteousness and justice in the world and to a hastening of the messianic age.

References 

2012 deaths
20th-century Israeli rabbis
21st-century Israeli rabbis
Israeli Conservative rabbis
Israeli veganism activists
Jewish vegetarianism